This is a list of state parks in Georgia. The park system of the US state of Georgia was founded in 1931 with Indian Springs State Park and Vogel State Park. Indian Springs has been operated by the state as a public park since 1825, making it perhaps the oldest state park in the United States. The newest state park is Don Carter State Park.

Since the economic crash of 2008, Georgia has halved the budget for the Division of State Parks and Historic Sites and turned over the management of five of the parks to Coral Hospitality, a Florida-based hotel and resort management company. The five parks are Amicalola Falls State Park & Lodge, Unicoi State Park & Lodge, Little Ocmulgee State Park & Lodge, Georgia Veterans State Park, and George T. Bagby State Park.

State parks

Historic sites

Former state parks

Other
Lake Lanier Islands were leased from the US Army Corps of Engineers by the Georgia Department of State Parks for a recreation resort.  The islands are now managed by a private company.
Stone Mountain Park is owned by the state and managed by the self-sufficient state agency, the Stone Mountain Memorial Association. It is operated as an amusement park under a contract with the Herschend Family Entertainment Corporation.

Images

See also
List of U.S. national parks

References

External links
Georgia state parks
 Map of Georgia State Parks

 
Georgia state parks
Parks